The ultimate goal of semantic technology is to help machines understand data. To enable the encoding of semantics with the data, well-known technologies are RDF (Resource Description Framework) and OWL (Web Ontology Language). These technologies formally represent the meaning involved in information. For example, ontology can describe concepts, relationships between things, and categories of things. These embedded semantics with the data offer significant advantages such as reasoning over data and dealing with heterogeneous data sources.

Overview
In software, semantic technology encodes meanings separately from data and content files, and separately from application code. This enables machines as well as people to understand, share and reason with them at execution time. With semantic technologies, adding, changing and implementing new relationships or interconnecting programs in a different way can be just as simple as changing the external model that these programs share.

With traditional information technology, on the other hand, meanings and relationships must be predefined and "hard wired" into data formats and the application program code at design time. This means that when something changes, previously unexchanged information needs to be exchanged, or two programs need to interoperate in a new way, the humans must get involved.

Off-line, the parties must define and communicate between them the knowledge needed to make the change, and then recode the data structures and program logic to accommodate it, and then apply these changes to the database and the application. Then, and only then, can they implement the changes.

Semantic technologies are "meaning-centered". They involve but are not limited to the following areas of application:
 encoding/decoding of semantic representation,
 knowledge graphs of entities and their interrelationships, 
 auto-recognition of topics and concepts, 
 information and meaning extraction,
 semantic data integration, and 
 taxonomies/classification.

Given a question, semantic technologies can directly search topics, concepts, associations that span a vast number of sources.

Semantic technologies provide an abstraction layer above existing IT technologies that enables bridging and interconnection of data, content, and processes. Second, from the portal perspective, semantic technologies can be thought of as a new level of depth that provides far more intelligent, capable, relevant, and responsive interaction than with information technologies alone. Semantic technologies would often leverage natural language processing and machine learning in order to extract topics, concepts, and associations between concepts in text.

See also 
 Knowledge graph
 Metadata
 Ontologyalso known as a knowledge graph in a generalized term
 Resource Description Framework
 Schema.orga set of schemas for structured data markup on web pages
 Semantic heterogeneity
 Semantic integration
 Semantic matching
 Semantic Web
 Web Ontology Language

References

Further reading 
 J.T. Pollock, R. Hodgson. Adaptive Information: Improving Business Through Semantic Interoperability, Grid Computing, and Enterprise Integration. John Wiley & Sons, October 2004
 R. Guha, R. McCool, and E. Miller. Semantic search. In WWW2003 — Proc. of the 12th international conference on World Wide Web, pp 700–709. ACM Press, 2003.
 I. Polikoff and D. Allemang. Semantic technology. TopQuadrant Technology Briefing v1.1, September 2003.
 T. Berners-Lee, J. Hendler, and O. Lassila. The Semantic Web: A new form of Web content that is meaningful to computers will unleash a revolution of new possibilities. Scientific American, May 2001.
 A.P. Sheth, C. Ramakrishnan. Semantic (Web) Technology In Action: Ontology Driven Information Systems For Search, Integration and Analysis. IEEE Data Engineering Bulletin, 2003.
 Steffen Staab, Rudi Studer  (Ed.), Handbook on Ontologies, Springer, 
 Mills Davis. The Business Value of Semantic Technologies. Presentation and Report. Semantic Technologies for E-Government, September 2004.
 Pascal Hitzler, Markus Krötzsch, Sebastian Rudolph, Foundations of Semantic Web Technologies, Chapman&Hall/CRC, 2009, 
 Milošević, Nikola, and Wolfgang Thielemann. "Comparison of biomedical relationship extraction methods and models for knowledge graph creation." Journal of Semantic Web (JoWS) (2022). Elsevier, doi: 10.1016/j.websem.2022.100756

Information retrieval techniques
Semantics
